Alexander Francis Boucher (November 13, 1881 – July 23, 1974), nicknamed "Bo", was a Major League Baseball third baseman who played for the St. Louis Terriers of the Federal League in .

External links

1881 births
1974 deaths
Major League Baseball third basemen
Baseball players from Massachusetts
St. Louis Terriers players
Lancaster Red Roses players
Albany Senators players
Holyoke Papermakers players
Little Rock Travelers players
St. Paul Saints (AA) players
Wilkes-Barre Barons (baseball) players
Youngstown Steelmen players
St. Marys Saints players